Estonian Open may refer to:
 Estonian Open (darts)
 Estonian Open (disc golf)

See also
 Estonian Cup